Lucía Sosa may refer to:

 Lucía Sosa (athlete) (born 1978), Mexican paralympic athlete
 Lucía Sosa (politician) (born 1957), Ecuadorian teacher and politician